Protoxinjiangchelys is an extinct genus of xinjiangchelyid turtle known from the Early to Late Jurassic of China (Xintiangou Formation and possibly also the Shaximiao Formation). It is known from the single species P. salis, which was named and described in 2012. It contains only the holotype, ZDM 3009, which consists of a complete shell with an articulated carapace and a complete plastron and possibly another, older specimen.

References

Testudinata
Prehistoric turtle genera
Toarcian first appearances
Jurassic turtles
Jurassic reptiles of Asia
Jurassic China
Fossils of China
Fossil taxa described in 2012